The New York Mets are a Major League Baseball franchise based in the New York City borough of Queens. Formed in 1962, they play in the National League East division. Pitchers for the Mets have thrown two no-hitters in franchise history. A no-hitter is officially recognized by Major League Baseball only "when a pitcher (or pitchers) allows no hits during the entire course of a game, which consists of at least nine innings", though one or more batters "may reach base via a walk, an error, a hit by pitch, a passed ball or wild pitch on strike three, or catcher's interference". No-hitters of less than nine complete innings were previously recognized by the league as official; however, several rule alterations in 1991 changed the rule to its current form. A no-hitter is rare enough that it took until 2021 for all thirty teams in Major League Baseball to accomplish the feat. No perfect games, a special subcategory of no-hitter, have been thrown in Mets history. As defined by Major League Baseball, "in a perfect game, no batter reaches any base during the course of the game."

No-hitters

See also
List of Major League Baseball no-hitters

References

No-hitters
New York Mets